

Overview

Domestic champions

International results

Domestic competitions

2009 Chinese Super League

2009 China League One

2009 China League Two

South Division

North Division

Play-offs

First round

Second round

Semi-finals / Promotion finals

Third place match

Champions final

Football at the 11th National Games of China
Matches will be held in Shandong, men's u20 competition will be held from 22 July to 1 August and u16, women's and women's u18 are scheduled to be played from 12 to 22 October.

China Women's Super League 2009

China Women's FA Cup 2009
First round

Chinese Reserve League 2009

Chinese U–19 League 2009
Updated to games played on 15 April 2009

Weifang Group

Yichang Group

Chinese U–17 League 2009

Chinese U–15 League 2009

China Futsal League 2008–09

International clubs competitions

AFC Champions League 2009

Group E

Group F

Group G

Group H

Pan-Pacific Championship 2009

Semi-final

Third place final

AFC Futsal Club Championship 2009
Group B

The tournament which was scheduled to be held from 4 to 11 July has been postponed due to 2009 Iranian election protests. No new dates have been announced.

National teams competitions

Men's senior team

2011 AFC Asian Cup qualification
Group D

Friendly matches

Women's senior team

2009 Algarve Cup
Group A

Fifth place match

2009 Four Nations Tournament

Women's 4 Nations Cup 2009

Other friendly matches

Men's U-23 team

Football at the 2009 East Asian Games
Matches were played in Hong Kong, China in December, 2009

Group Stage

Men's U-20 team

AFC U-19 Championship 2010 qualification
Group G
All matches was held in Zibo, China from November 1 to November 15, 2009

Friendly matches

Men's U-17 team

AFC U-16 Championship 2010 qualification
Group F
Matches are scheduled to be played from October 3 to 18, 2009 in China

Men's U-14 team

Football at the 2009 Asian Youth Games
Preliminary Group B

Final Group A

Semi-final

Bronze medal match

Women's U-20 team

AFC U-19 Women's Championship 2009
Matches will be held in Wuhan, China from August 1 to 12, 2009
Group B

International tournament in Russia
Group B

Semi-final

Final

Women's U-17 team

AFC U-16 Women's Championship 2009
Matches will be held in Bangkok, Thailand from November 4 to 15 , 2009
Group B

Women's universities team

Football at the 2009 Summer Universiade
Group A

First place quarter-final

Fifth place semi-final

Seventh place final

Men's futsal team

China International Futsal Tournament 2009

EAFF Futsal Championship 2009
EAFF Futsal Championship 2009 is also the qualification match for 2010 AFC Futsal Championship, Matches were held in Beijing, China from November 24th to 29th 2009.

Group Stage:

Kickout Stage:
Semifinal

Final

Women's futsal team

Futsal at the 2009 Asian Indoor Games
Matches will be held in Hanoi, Vietnam from 30 October to 08 November, 2009.

Beach soccer team

2009 FIFA Beach Soccer World Cup

References